Gong Maoxin and Zhang Ze were the defending champions but lost in the first round to Nam Ji-sung and Song Min-kyu.

Andrew Harris and Marc Polmans won the title after defeating Alex Bolt and Matt Reid 6–0, 6–1 in the final.

Seeds

Draw

References

External links
 Main draw

Ningbo Challenger - Doubles